Mixels is a 2014-2016 comedy animated television series that aired on Cartoon Network and was co-produced by The Lego Group and Cartoon Network Studios. The series first aired on February 12, 2014, with a new episode of Teen Titans Go!. The series revolves around the Mixels, small creatures that can mix and combine with one another. Mixels are opposed by the evil Nixels, small, discolored and evil creatures led by King Nixel. 

Although previous Lego series, such as Lego Ninjago: Masters of Spinjitzu and Lego Legends of Chima, use CGI animation, Mixels made use of Toon Boom Harmony software, animated at Atomic Cartoons, Inc., before later being animated traditionally at Digital eMation, Inc., Big Star Entertainment, Inc., and Saerom Animation, Inc. A mobile app was released for the series on March 4, 2014, named Calling All Mixels, and even earlier two websites, one on the LEGO website and another owned by Cartoon Network, were launched where fans can learn about the Mixels. Nine series of collectible Lego building toys were also released, based on the characters. On February 19, 2014, the series had begun airing as an interstitial program on Boomerang, and still currently airs as such.

The TV series wrapped up production in July 2016, and the series finale aired on October 1, 2016, marking the end of the franchise, with bar references in Uncle Grandpa and The Lego Movie 2: The Second Part.

Premise
Mixels consists of 24 tribes who each have a different color scheme and inhabit a fantasy landscape. These creatures can Mix (a two-Mixel combination), Max (a three-Mixel combination and the tribe's own one), and Murp (a failed Mix) in all kinds of situations, using items called cubits, which inhabit the Mixels.

Characters

Mixels
Mixels consists of many different, fun-loving tribes who each have a different color scheme. It is noted that American voice actors play Gox (Chris Cox), Camillot (Jeff Bennett), Jinky (Jeff Bennett), Mixadel (Richard Steven Horvitz), and King Mixelot (Dave Fennoy), who are all British-accented characters.

Series 1

Infernites
Based on fire, the Infernites are the red primary tribe of Series 1. They live in the ‘Magma Wastelands’ near the center of ‘Mixel Land’.

 Flain (voiced by Tom Kenny) − Flain is the leader of the tribe called the ‘Infernites’, along with the other Mixels. Flain is adventurous and smart because he is known to his friends as ‘the smart one’. His head is on fire. When he thinks deeply or gets angry, his head runs the risk of catching on fire, so he tries to stay calm.
 Vulk (voiced by Jess Harnell) − Vulk is a one-eyed Mixel who is dimwitted but liked by his friends. Among his looks is how he is one of many cyclopses. His superheated hands can melt through solid rocks and the ‘Nixels’, however he may inadvertently hurt other Mixels with those hands, which make another Mixels not want to have high-fives or anything else with him.
 Zorch (voiced by David P. Smith) − Zorch is an Infernite who has fiery jets that let him "run around with surprising speed". He is a "crazy prankster", but well liked by his friends of whom he sometimes plays pranks on. His fiery jets from his rear leave the Nixels standing in a smoke cloud.

Cragsters
Based on rock, the Cragsters are the secondary tribe of Series 1. They live in tunnels that they have dug deep under the surface of Mixel Land.

 Krader (voiced by David P. Smith) − Krader is a super-strong and tough Mixel with a short temper. Roughly considered the Cragsters' leader, he has a rotating torso and massive hand, which can fold into a demolition ball, allowing him to bulldoze through rocks and dig deep pits to trap the Nixels.
 Seismo (voiced by Tom Kenny) − Seismo is a lanky and shy Mixel who can cause earthquakes with his unusually massive feet; he uses this ability as a weapon against the Nixels.
 Shuff (voiced by Jess Harnell) − Shuff is helpful and friendly, but very clumsy. His body is like "a living wrecking ball", and he accidentally destroys everything with it.

Electroids
Based on electricity, the Electroids are the yellow tertiary tribe of Series 1. They live in the Mountain Forest and stay as close as possible to the lightning storms that energize them.

 Teslo (voiced by Tom Kenny) − Teslo is the leader of the Electroids. He fights with his electrically charged tail. While usually level-headed, he has an open secret fear of heights. He is one of many cyclopses.
 Zaptor (voiced by Jess Harnell) − Zaptor is energetic and thrives on action. He is capable of releasing massive blasts of energy and blinding light, but overuses his ability, much to the chagrin of the other Mixels.
 Volectro (voiced by David P. Smith) − Volectro stores electricity in his hair. When overloaded with electricity, he can draw objects to himself with static electricity that charges his hair.

Series 2

Frosticons
Based on ice, the Frosticons are the blue secondary tribe of Series 2. They live near the crystalized shells of dead volcanoes.

 Flurr (voiced by Phil LaMarr) − Flurr is the leader of the Frosticons. Flurr is the only Frosticon who never feels sleepy and likes to fly around and explore Frosticon lands. He is good at spotting Nixels that are invaded far away, but sometimes misses obvious things.
 Slumbo (voiced by Fred Tatasciore) − Slumbo is the sleepiest Frosticon. It takes an earthquake to wake him up, but when he is awake, he has the power to move giant objects and create obstacles for the Nixels. Slumbo can brain-freeze the Mixels from making ice tunnels.
 Lunk (voiced by Billy West) − An unbelievably slow Frosticon, Lunk makes the other Frosticons seem positively energetic. He is not the brainiest or the most graceful when waddling across ice and balancing on his stubby hands, but his thick ice exoskeleton makes him incredibly durable. When he is sneezing, he can instantly freeze a Nixel in an ice cube.

Fang Gang
Based on eating and wood, the Fang Gang are the brown primary tribe of Series 2. They live on a farm.

 Gobba (voiced by Billy West) − Gobba is the bite-loving leader of the Fang Gang who can use his sensitive, whiplike tongue to seek out food on his homeland, a farm. He is the best taster of feelings among the Fang Gang, carving totem poles.
 Jawg (voiced by Fred Tatasciore) − Jawg is a character who protects his friends by using his indestructible teeth. He is a dog who can speak, and will not hesitate to bite intruders with his teeth.
 Chomly (voiced by Phil LaMarr) − Chomly is the lazy trash compactor of the Fang Gang who will try to crunch just about anything not nailed down. Chomly is close-talking and has incredibly bad breath. This makes no Mixel wanting to be stuck next to Chomly at a 'Fang Gang food party', but his stinking breath comes in handy for repelling the Nixels.

Flexers
Based on rubber, the Flexers are the orange tertiary tribe of Series 2. They live in the Rubberlands, in line with what they are based on.

 Kraw (voiced by Fred Tatasciore) − Kraw might be short, but he is one confident character. Claiming to be the smartest Mixel, he loves to challenge the Mixels to a quiz, but his main strength is to turn into a bouncy, rubber super ball to evade or smash Nixels. He is one of many cyclopses.
 Tentro (voiced by Phil LaMarr) − The incredibly elasticated Tentro is one of the most powerful of the Flexers. Despite being strong and super intelligent, he lacks confidence. No one knows why, though, because he has tentacles that pack a huge punch and the ability to climb any surface and capture any Nixel who attacks him.
 Balk (voiced by Billy West) − Balk may be the slowest of the Flexers, but his mallet-like head can hit, pummel, and crush whatever is in the way. His head-butting has bashed his brain cells, so he can be forgetful when finding it hard to spit out the right words, yet there is nobody better than him to defend the Rubberlands, where the Flexers themselves live, from Nixel Invasions.

Series 3

Glorp Corp
Based on slime, the Glorp Corp are the green primary tribe of Series 3. They are swamp-dwelling thrill-seekers.

 Glomp (voiced by Maddie Taylor) − Glomp is the leader of the Glorp Corp. He always "hatches hair-brained schemes" and plays goofy games, making him have lots of fun. Mixels will not get too close: the tallest Glorp Corp member usually has slimy hands and a runny nose. He is one of many cyclopses.
 Glurt (voiced by Bumper Robinson) − Glurt is a slimy hound-like creature who is the most excitable member of the Glorp Corp. With a pointy tail and a yapping mouth, he slobbers with delight when he sees anyone. An avid garbage collector, he gobbles up all the trash, cleaning up after the Glorp Corp.
 Torts (voiced by Carlos Alazraqui) − Torts has bulky feet and is the slowest-moving member of the Glorp Corp. A slob who enjoys playing for thrills, he shoots gloopy, green slime from his hands. Anything can stick to him, which is great fun when goofing around and perfect for catching Nixels.

Spikels
Based on spikes, the Spikels are the tertiary tribe of Series 3. They live in a feminine-like home.

 Scorpi (voiced by Maria Bamford) − The leader of the Spikels, Scorpi loves bedtime-esque things. He always sees life with wonder and scuttles around on his centipede-like legs when seeking fun. He loves to hug and snuggle, but beware of his dangerous, pointy tail.
 Footi (voiced by Bumper Robinson) − "Livewire" Footi can't stop moving at all. Everyday's moment always bursts with exciting possibilities for him. He loves to skip, jump, and dance. The other Mixels must give him plenty of room when he starts stomping around; his huge, spiky feet are dangerous, so Mixels must watch out. He is characterized as feminine due to his voice.
 Hoogi (voiced by Maddie Taylor) − Hoogi is the slowest-moving of the Spikels. He has giant fang teeth and is also super affectionate, giving the Mixels the best hugs with his lanky arms. He walks as slowly as a zombie, but getting grabbed by his spiky hands can be painful: Mixels may want to avoid one of his hugs.

Wiztastics
Based on magic, the Wiztastics are a purple traveling troupe of magicians and the secondary tribe of Series 3. They live in a magic tent and put on shows for the Mixels.

 Magnifo (voiced by Brian Stepanek) − Magnifo is the most smart and most serious of the Wiztastics. With a wizard's hat, a wizard's cape, and two magic wands, he puts energy into every show with the help of his bumbling assistants. Even if the Mixels think his act is cheesy, they shouldn't tell him or the rest of the Wiztastics; they love it. He is one of many cyclopses.
 Mesmo (voiced by Carlos Alazraqui) − Mesmo looks the part of magic with his expressive wizard-hat eyelids, goatee beard, and magic tail that drops spells. But his problem is that he lacks in showmanship; Mesmo needs help peacocking his huge wings and stealing the show.
 Wizwuz (voiced by Bumper Robinson) − Wizwuz is the over-enthusiastic magician's assistant of the Wiztastics. On stage, he constantly messes up the show, but his improvised antics are half the fun. Whether burping spells or hanging from the ceiling, Wizwuz loves to perform and make the audience laugh.

Series 4

Orbitons
Based on space, the Orbitons are the secondary tribe of Series 4. They live in Orbitopia of the Mixel Moon.

 Niksput (voiced by Andrew Kishino) − The leader of the Orbitons, Niksput is charismatic but unintelligent, and often pretends to be smarter and braver than he actually is. He can fly at high speeds, but often crashes due to his lack of skill. He is Also one of many cyclopses.
 Nurp-Naut (voiced by Justin Grollman for Nurp and Rodger Bumpass for Naut) − Nurp-Naut has two personalities : Nurp is playful and childlike, and Naut is serious and mature. These personalities are aware of each other and even communicate with each other. Whenever his personality changes his head spins rapidly. Naut is also one of many cyclopses.
 Rokit (voiced by Phil Hayes) − Rokit is incredibly serious. Whenever he does something, he puts his full effort into it. He is often frustrated about the other Oritons' lack of discipline.

Infernite Cousins
Based on fire, the Infernite Cousins are the primary tribe of Series 4. They, like the Infernites, live in the Magma Wastelands near the center of Mixel Land.

 Meltus (voiced by Jess Harnell) − Meltus may look scary, but he is really a shy and nervous Infernite who is allergic to everything. Even when he walks outside, he starts sneezing fire.
 Flamzer (voiced by Rodger Bumpass) − Dramatic and anxious, he can move quickly, like a scaredy-cat. He is one of many cyclopses.
 Burnard (voiced by Jess Harnell) − Everything is funny to Burnard. He laughs a lot; he even laughs through fear and sadness. Even if he laughs hard enough, he spews fire. However, the only way to make him stop laughing is by telling him a funny joke whose punchline he does not get.

Glowkies
Based on bioluminescence, the Glowkies are the tertiary tribe of Series 4. They live in a cave on the Mixel Moon.

 Globert (voiced by Dave Fennoy) − Globert is flamboyant, and loves to perform. He is one of many cyclopses with their largest eye.
 Vampos (voiced by Sam Riegel) − Vampos is the athletic member of the Glowkies. Although he loves sports, he is considered very relaxed and calm.
 Boogly (voiced by Dave Fennoy) − Boogly is snobbish, and complains about almost everything. He is one of many cyclopses.

Series 5

Klinkers
 Gox (voiced by Chris Cox) − Gox is almost like a tycoon from the Steam Age.
 Jinky (voiced by Jeff Bennett) − Jinky is an old heavy metal star in the form of a walking boiler-room.
 Kamzo (voiced by Steve Blum) − A moody dumpster-dweller, Kamzo is only happy when going on a mechanical mission.

Frosticon Cousins
The second part of the Frosticons.
 Krog (voiced by Dave Fennoy) − A living garbage disposal, he can chomp through anything.
 Chilbo (voiced by Griffin Burns) − Chilbo is a know-it-all who is always ready to explain everything obvious in relentless detail.
 Snoof (voiced by Daran Norris) − Snoof is a bright-eyed bumpkin who has a naive fascination, with his world around him.

Lixers
Yellow Mixels who always like to lick things.
 Spugg (voiced by Daran Norris) − Super-curious and alert, he has a rotating head that keeps an eye on everything around him.
 Turg (voiced by Peter Jason) − Turg looks like an experiment gone wrong and is part frog, part chicken, and part unknown. He has an extra long tongue.
 Tungster (voiced by Tom Kenny) − His tongue is really long and slightly bigger than Turg's.

Series 6

Weldos
Based on the construction workers.
 Kramm (voiced by Dave Fennoy) − He has a jackhammer for a hand.
 Forx (voiced by Chris Cox) − His jaw is like a bucket and he his eyebrows look like horns.
 Wuzzo (voiced by Peter Jason) − His nose is shaped like a chainsaw.

Glorp Corp Cousins
The second version of the Glorp Corp.
 Dribbal (voiced by Jeff Bennett) − A smart leader of the Glorp Corp Cousins. He has glasses.
 Gurggle (voiced by Jeff Bennett) − A taller member of the tribe who has long slimy legs.
 Slusho (voiced by Griffin Burns) − A flying member of the tribe who has sneezing powers.

Munchos
Purple Mixels who always eat things.
 Snax (voiced by Griffin Burns) − He has big cheeks with which he looks like he's chewing.
 Berp (voiced by Tom Kenny) − He has several arms which he can use to serve food and his mouth looks like a bucket.
 Vaka-Waka (voiced by Jess Harnell for Vaka and Daran Norris for Waka) − Vaka-Waka is conjoined: he is two Mixels in one!

Series 7

Mixopolis City Police Department (MCPD)
Mixels that are based on police officers.
 Kuffs (voiced by Phil Hayes, later by Steve Blum) − He has handcuffs which he can use to arrest people.
 Busto (voiced by Chris Cox) − Like a living jail cell which he can use to bust others.
 Tiketz (voiced by Daran Norris) − A living motorcycle-like character who can ride and take tickets from others.

Medivals
Medieval related Mixels.
 Camillot (voiced by Jeff Bennett) − A living castle with a cannon like a nose.
 Mixadel (voiced by Richard Steven Horvitz) − A living catapult who can shoot rocks.
 Paladum (voiced by Eric Bauza) − A flying Medival.

Mixies
Yellow Mixels that are related to musicians.
 Jamzy (voiced by Cree Summer) − A living guitar.
 Tapsy − A living drum set who can tap himself.
 Trumpsy − A living trumpet who can play trumpet noises through his mouth.

Series 8

Mixopolis City Fire Department (MCFD)
Mixels who work as firefighters.
 Splasho (voiced by Richard Steven Horvitz) − His neck is shaped like a ladder which he can use to climb.
 Aquad (voiced by Steve Blum) − A sliding Mixel who can shoot water from the sides of his body.
 Hydro (voiced by Jess Harnell) − A living fire hydrant who can also shoot water out of his mouth.

Pyrratz
Pirate related Mixels.
 Sharx (voiced by Peter Jason) − His head is like a shark.
 Skulzy − He has a skull as a head and wears an eye patch in front of which he hides and stores some loot.
 Lewt − A living treasure chest full of loot.

Medix
Mixels who are related to doctors.
 Surgeo (voiced by Jess Harnell) − He is like a surgeon.
 Skrubz − His head looks like a light stand and his hands both have defibrillation paddles.
 Tuth (voiced by Peter Jason) − He is related to a dentist. He looks like a big tooth who wears a blue bow tie and has a toothbrush instead of one arm.

Series 9

Trashoz
Mixels who are like garbage collectors.
 Gobbol − He is like a living dumpster. He can eat garbage.
 Sweepz − He has brushes for hands which he can use to sweep things.
 Compax − He is a living garbage truck. He can pick up garbage and later compact them somewhere.

Nindjas
Ninja-like Mixels.
 Mysto (voiced by Tom Kenny) − A wise master of the Nindjas.
 Cobrax (voiced by Leonard Garner) − A cobra-like Nindja.
 Spinza (voiced by Steve Blum) − He has spinning powers.

Newzers
Mixels who are like news reporters.
 Screeno (voiced by Tom Kenny) − He is like a living TV and his head is like a screen.
 Camsta (voiced by Gregg Bissonette) − A camera-like Newzer who can fly.
 Myke (voiced by Gregg Bissonette) − He mostly uses a microphone.

Other characters

Nixels
Nixels are evil creatures, unlike the Mixels. These include:

 The species in general (all voiced by Fred Tatasciore) − The main villains of the series, Nixels are annoying and destructive little creatures who are spread all over the land of the Mixels. They live to tear down and break apart the world around them, including any combinations that the Mixels create. When they swarm together, they break apart a Mixel in seconds. They used to only say "nix", but they later say more wording.
 Major Nixel (voiced by Fred Tatasciore, later by Rodger Bumpass, and afterward Peter Jason) − Major Nixel is the Nixels' military leader. He is the only Nixel capable of speech and is abusive towards his underlings. He resembles a war general with a mustache. He is also the only Nixel without being in a Lego set.
 King Nixel (voiced by Phil Hayes, later by Steve Blum) − King Nixel is the true leader of the Nixels.

Mixamals
 Amphipod (voiced by Daran Norris) −
 Mixapod (voiced by Eric Bauza) −
 Mixeloptors (all voiced by Michael Winslow) −
 Mixie Cat (voiced by Richard Steven Horvitz) −

Mixels
In addition to the original Mixels, there are other Mixels who don't have a Lego set. These include:
 Scrud (voiced by Richard Steven Horvitz) − He is a Frosticon.
 Narrator (voiced by Rodger Bumpass) − He is a Frosticon.
 Teacher (voiced by Cree Summer) − She is a Flexer, and is the only female character.
 Booger (voiced by Tom Kenny) − He is a member of the Glorp Corp.
 Blip (voiced by Tom Kenny) − He is a Spikel.
 Ranger Jinx (voiced by Jeff Bennett) − He is a Spikel.
 Gate Keeper (voiced by Rodger Bumpass) − He is a Spikel.
 Principal Knave (voiced by Chris Cox) − He is a Klinker.
 Referee (voiced by Phil Hayes) − He is a Muncho.
 Zabo (voiced by Jess Harnell) − He is a Muncho.
 Sergeant (voiced by Dave Fennoy) − He is part of the MCPD.
 King Mixelot (voiced by Dave Fennoy) − He is a Medival.
 Fire Chief (voiced by Peter Jason) − He is part of the MCFD.

Episodes

Series overview

Season 1 (2014)

Season 2 (2015–16)

Merchandise

Lego Mixels

Lego Mixels is a Lego theme based on a variety of tribes living in a fantastical diverse world and are small creatures that can mix and combine with one another to create new characters. The theme was first introduced in 2014. It was eventually discontinued by the end of 2016.

Overview
The Lego Group handles all toy merchandise for the Mixels franchise, and Cartoon Network handles all non-toy merchandising. The Lego Mixels buildable collectible figurines went on sale on March 1, 2014. Each character has their own set, and nine were released as part of series one. For each tribe, one of the three sets contains a Nixel. Series 2 was released at the end of May, and Series 3 was released at the end of August. Series 4 was released on February 1, 2015.

Development
Before Cartoon Network came to Lego, Mixels was called Monsters. It had sets of five in a tribe with overly simple designs. Some design changes include Shuff and Seismo's names being swapped with each other, Shuff having a looser crystal on his head that would have looked more like hair, Vulk's ears being red instead of black, the Nixels coming in various shapes, and Balk originally being shorter and squatter with thinner tentacles and smaller pupils. Kraw was originally named Bouncer, Gobba was Chippo, and Tentro was Flexi; other sources still slip up on Tentro and call him Flexi, though, including the Lego Magazine once.

Lego designer Gemma Anderson explained the importance of the Max figure in designing each tribe's individual figures and stating that, "During the sketching phase, I would consider what the tribe theme is and then work out what the max could be, at the same time wondering how I can use certain parts from the Max in the 3 small Mixels. It's often a case of going back and forth between the 3 models and the Max." Anderson also highlighted the importance in the characters' faces in capturing a unique personality and explained, "The eyes and mouths are a huge part of the personality of the Mixel, changing the eyebrows for example can drastically change the expressions from sad to happy, or even angry! We would often brainstorm on the names of the character; some of them might be inside jokes with the team. One example is 'Tuth' in Series 8, it was a joke in the team that me being from Wales, I pronounce some words a little differently, such as 'tooth' sounding more like 'tuth'. We decided during the naming process, we would try to name that one Mixel how I pronounce it, and we succeeded."

Sets
According to Bricklink, The Lego Group released 90 playsets as part of the Lego Mixels theme. The product line was eventually discontinued by the end of 2016.

Series 1
Series 1 was released on March 1, 2014, and consists of the tribes the Infernites, the Cragsters, and the Electroids.

Series 2
Series 2 was released on June 1, 2014, and consists of the tribes the Frosticons, the Fang Gang, and the Flexers.

Series 3
Series 3 was released on September 1, 2014, and consists of the tribes the Glorp Corp, the Spikels, and the Wiztastics.

Series 4
Series 4 was released on February 1, 2015, and consists of the tribes the Orbitons, the Infernite Cousins, and the Glowkies.

Series 5
Series 5 was released on June 1, 2015, and consists of the tribes the Klinkers, the Frosticon Cousins, and the Lixers.

Series 6
Series 6 was released on October 1, 2015, and consists of the tribes the Weldos, the Glorp Corp Cousins, and the Munchos.

Series 7 
Series 7 was released on February 1, 2016, and consists of the tribes the MCPD (Mixopolis City Police Department), the Medivals, and the Mixies.

Series 8 
Series 8 was released on June 1, 2016, and consists of the tribes the MCFD (Mixopolis City Fire Department), the Pyrratz, and the Medix.

Series 9
Series 9–the final series of the line–was released on October 1, 2016, and consists of the tribes the Trashoz, the Nindjas, and the Newzers.

Discontinuation
Shortly after Cartoon Network announced that the episode "Nixel Nixel Go Away" will be the series finale, The Lego Group cancelled production of the toy line. As a result, the theme was discontinued.

Awards and nominations
In 2014, Mixels won the Pocket Money award at the London Toy Fair Best New Toy Awards.

See also
Lego Scooby-Doo
Lego DC Super Hero Girls
Lego The Powerpuff Girls
Lego Unikitty!
The Lego Movie

References

External links
 

2014 American television series debuts
2016 American television series endings
2010s American animated television series
American children's animated comedy television series
American children's animated fantasy television series
Cartoon Network original programming
Cartoon Network franchises
Lego television series
Lego themes
American flash animated television series
English-language television shows